Sperm-associated antigen 7 is a protein that in humans is encoded by the SPAG7 gene.

References

Further reading

External links 
 PDBe-KB provides an overview of all the structure information available in the PDB for Human Sperm-associated antigen 7